David Weinstein (born 1954 in Chicago) is an American musician and composer.  He has been cited as avant garde and postmodern by The New York Times. He has performed his compositions in musical groups such as Impossible Music (with Nicolas Collins), and in collaboration with visual artists.

In 1978, with Jim Staley and Dan Senn, Weinstein founded the avant-garde music institution Roulette Intermedium, which presented concerts and performances in a loft in Tribeca.

In 1992, along with Shelley Hirsch, he won the international Prix Futura award for excellence in the radio "docu-musical" O Little Town of East New York.

References

American male composers
1954 births
Living people
Musicians from Chicago
21st-century American composers
Experimental Music Studios alumni
21st-century American male musicians